

The Avro Type G was a two-seat biplane designed by A.V. Roe to participate in the 1912 British Military Aeroplane Competition. It is notable in having  a fully enclosed crew compartment, and was also the first aircraft to have recovered from a spin in front of witnesses.

Design and development
The Avro Type G was a two-seat two bay biplane with a fully enclosed crew compartment.  The fuselage occupied the entire gap between upper and lower wings, which were of Roe's characteristic high aspect ratio.  Two prototypes were started, one with a Green engine, the other with an ABC. The latter engine was not delivered in time, and the second prototype was abandoned.

At the trials, the Type G was placed first in the assembly tests (erected in 14½ minutes) and the fuel consumption tests, but its poor rate of climb prevented it from winning a major prize, although Avro were awarded £100.
However, the Type G did later set a British endurance record of 7 hours 31 minutes piloted by F. P. Raynham at Brooklands on 24 October (a record broken only one hour later by Harry Hawker).
 
It was the second British airplane to have recovered from a spin, and the first to do so in front of witnesses. Early on the morning of 25 August Lt Wilfred Parke, with Lt Breton as passenger, took off to make an endurance trial. By a combination of luck and cool nerves coupled with flying skill, he was able to recover when barely  feet above the ground, the craft suddenly righting itself and flying off under perfect control. Parke's ability to clearly report on his experience to expert witnesses of the event was most important, since going into a spin had previously meant almost certain death.

Specifications

References

Further reading

External links
 Avro Type G – British Aircraft Directory

1910s British military utility aircraft
Type G
Single-engined tractor aircraft
Biplanes
Aircraft first flown in 1912